Karolina Wigura (born 1 October 1980 in Warsaw) is a sociologist, historian of ideas and journalist. She is Member of the Board of Kultura Liberalna Foundation (Liberal Culture), which publishes Kultura Liberalna, one of Poland's leading weekly magazines. She is also an assistant professor at Warsaw University's Institute of Sociology and member of the European Council on Foreign Relations.

Academic background 
Karolina Wigura graduated from the Institute of Sociology (2003) and Political Science (2005) under the programme of the College of Inter-Area Individual Studies In the Humanities and Social Sciences at the University of Warsaw. Her doctorate thesis was conducted as part of a PhD program at the Institute of Sociology (University of Warsaw, UW) and at the Faculty of Philosophy and Theology at the Ludwig Maximilian University of Munich. She was awarded a doctorate thesis in Social Sciences in 2009 (titled “Declarations of Forgiveness and Repentance in Politics: Examples from the history of Poland, Germany and Ukraine, 1945-2006. Theories and Practice”). She works as a lecturer at Warsaw University's Institute of Sociology and the Chair of History of Sociological Thought, and is a member of the Intradepartmental Social Memory Section at the Institute of Sociology.

Her academic interests include political philosophy of the twentieth century, especially of Hannah Arendt, Paul Ricoeur, Vladimir Jankélévitch and Karl Jaspers; sociology and ethics of memory, with a focus on transitional justice, historical guilt, reconciliation and forgiveness in politics – these are the core themes of the book she published in 2011, titled “Wina narodów. Przebaczenie jako strategia prowadzenia polityki" (The Guilt of Nations. Forgiveness as a Political Strategy). She also devotes her research to the history of ideas of emotions. In 2019 she published a book devoted to these subjects under the title "Wynalazek nowoczesnego serca. Filozoficzne źródła współczesnego myślenia o emocjach" (The Invention of Modern Heart. Philosophical Sources of Contemporary Thinking of Emotions). In the book, she argued that the seventienth century philosophy, especially of Thomas Hobbes, Baruch Spinoza and René Descartes, made a decisive contribution to the creation of contemporary concept of emotions.

Her book “Wina narodów” was awarded the Józef Tischner’s prize in 2012, and was nominated for the Jerzy Turowicz’s prize a year later. She was awarded the Bronisław Geremek’s Junior Visiting Scholarship at the Institute for Human Sciences in Vienna (2012/2013), the Marshal Memorial Fellowship from the German Marshall Fund and was a POMP (Programme on Modern Poland) Visiting Fellow in St. Antony’s College at University of Oxford (2016). She has also conducted research at Central European University in Budapest (2015) and secured research grants from the National Science Centre in Poland – “Preludium” and “Sonata”. She gratudated from the Leadership Academy for Poland in 2018 and currently she is a visiting fellow at the Institute of Advanced Study in Berlin (2019/2020).

From 2016 to 2018, together with Jarosław Kuisz , she was co-directing the Polish Programme at St. Antony’s College at Oxford University, entitled “Knowledge Bridges: Poland - Britain - Europe”.

Journalistic activities 
Karolina Wigura worked as a journalist for the Polskie Radio Program II (Polish Radio Two) between 2003 and 2006 and, up until 2009 in Tygodnik Idei Europa [Europe Weekly], the intellectual cultural-political supplement to the daily Dziennik. Polska Europa Świat. She was awarded the 2008 Grand Press prize for her interview with Jürgen Habermas “Europe in death paralysis”, published in “Europa” earlier that year.

She is a co-founder of Kultura Liberalna (Liberal Culture), Poland's leading online intellectual, political and cultural weekly. She is Member of the Board of the Kultura Liberalna Foundation. Her work has been published in The Guardian, The New York Times, Gazeta Wyborcza, Rzeczpospolita, Przegląd Polityczny, Tygodnik Powszechny, Znak and other periodicals. In 2015, together with Maciej Zięba and Marek Zając, she prepared a political and cultural television programme for TVP Kultura (Polish public television channel devoted to culture), entitled “To nie tak” (It is not like that). She frequently provides commentary on Polish and international politics for print and electronic media.

Among her most important journalistic interventions there are the essay published in The Guardian about Poland after 2016, where she argued that the Law and Justice's victory in Poland in 2015 was a result of widespread frustrations and a return to the pre-2015 period would not be desirable, and the two essays in The New York Times she co-authored with Jarosław Kuisz. The first, titled "Against Liberal Defeatism" was a pladoyer for hope in politics. "Liberalism means belief in the freedom of the individual; therefore it demands trust in the people. It also requires optimism. In order not to fall into dangerous determinism or counterproductive defensiveness, we have to remember that the greatest successes of liberal democracies emerged from hope" - Kuisz and Wigura wrote. In the second, "Want to Save Europe? Learn From Poland", they wrote: "It’s true that democracy has suffered under Law and Justice. But there’s another story about Poland that needs to be told, one about how liberals are learning to fight for democracy" and described the new strategies liberal politicians were inventing in the struggle with populism in Poland.

Public activities 

Karolina Wigura is a widely invited public speaker, concentrating mostly on emotions in politics. In the recent years, she was invited both as panelist and keynote speaker to Athens Democracy Forum, Annual Meetings of the ECFR, Amsterdam-based De Balie, and Forum 2000 in Prague, where she spoke about the feeling of loss, and politics of fear vs. politics of hope. 

Between 2012 and 2016, she was a member of the board of Stefan Batory Foundation. She has also been a member of the Programme Board of the Congress of Women since 2010; between 2014 and 2016 she was a member of the Programme Board of EFNI.

References 

Living people
Polish journalists
Polish women journalists
Polish sociologists
1980 births
Foreign policy writers
Populism scholars